This is a list of airlines currently operating in Uzbekistan.

Scheduled airlines

Cargo airlines

See also
 List of airlines
 List of defunct airlines of Uzbekistan
 List of defunct airlines of Asia

Uzbekistan
Airlines
Airlines
Uzbekistan